The Odeon is a small 500-seat theatre in Amman, Jordan. Not to be confused with the large Roman Theatre that stands right next to it, on the southern side of the Hashemite Plaza, while the Odeon stands on the east side of the Plaza.

Description
Archaeologists have speculated that the Odeon was most likely closed by a temporary wooden roof that shielded the audience from the weather.

History
The building is a Roman odeon, built in the 2nd century CE, at the same time as the Roman Theatre next to it.

The Odeon was recently restored along with the nearby Nymphaeum fountain.

Modern use
The Odeon is used nowadays for concerts, the most popular being the annually held Al-Balad Music Festival.

References

Buildings and structures in Amman
Amman
Tourist attractions in Amman
Amman
A